Africa Fashion Week (London) is an annual fashion week held in London, England.

In 2012 the Africa Fashion Week London team took a trip to Westfield Stratford City  with the theme "Fun Day Flyering at Westfield".

References

Fashion events in England
Annual events in London
English fashion
Fashion weeks